The mayor–council government system is a system of local government that has a mayor who is directly elected by the voters serve as chief executive, and a separately elected legislative city council. It is one of the two most common forms of local government in the United States, and is also used in Brazil, Canada, Italy, Israel, New Zealand, Poland, and Turkey. It is the one most frequently adopted in large cities, although the other form, council–manager government, is the local government form of more municipalities.

The form may be categorized into two main variations depending on the relative power of the mayor compared to the council. In a typical strong-mayor system, the elected mayor is granted almost total administrative authority with the power to appoint and dismiss department heads. In such a system, the mayor's administrative staff prepares the city budget, although that budget usually must be approved by the council.

Conversely, in a weak-mayor system, the mayor has no formal authority outside the council, serving a largely ceremonial role as council chairperson. The mayor cannot directly appoint or remove officials, and lacks veto power over council votes.

Most major American cities use the strong-mayor form of the mayor–council system, whereas middle-sized and small American cities tend to use the council–manager system.

See also
City commission government
Council–manager government
Executive arrangements in England

References

Forms of local government
Local government in the United States
Local government in Canada